The 13th Independent Battery Wisconsin Light Artillery, was an artillery battery that served in the Union Army during the American Civil War.

Service 
The 13th Independent Battery was mustered into service at Milwaukee, Wisconsin, on December 29, 1863, and spent its entire service in garrisons at New Orleans, Louisiana, and Baton Rouge, Louisiana. The battery was mustered out on July 20, 1865.

Total strength and casualties 
The 13th Independent Battery initially recruited 156 officers and men.  An additional 32 men were recruited as replacements, for a total of 188
men.

The battery suffered 14 enlisted men who died of disease, for a total of 14 fatalities.

Commanders
 Captain Richard R. Griffith

See also

 List of Wisconsin Civil War units
 Wisconsin in the American Civil War

Notes

References
The Civil War Archive

Military units and formations established in 1863
Military units and formations disestablished in 1865
Units and formations of the Union Army from Wisconsin
Wisconsin
1863 establishments in Wisconsin